Pallian Kalan is a village in Shaheed Bhagat Singh Nagar district of Punjab State, India. The village is administrated by Sarpanch an elected representative of the village.

Demography 
As of 2011, Pallian Kalan has a total number of 123 houses and population of 594 of which 308 include are males while 286 are females according to the report published by Census India in 2011. The literacy rate of Pallian Kalan is 77.95% higher than the state average of 75.84%. The population of children under the age of 6 years is 68 which is 11.45% of total population of Pallian Kalan, and child sex ratio is approximately 1000 as compared to Punjab state average of 846.

Most of the people are from Schedule Caste which constitutes 38.55% of total population in Pallian Kalan. The town does not have any Schedule Tribe population so far.

As per the report published by Census India in 2011, 333 people were engaged in work activities out of the total population of Pallian Kalan which includes 166 males and 167 females. According to census survey report 2011, 96.70% workers describe their work as main work and 3.30% workers are involved in Marginal activity providing livelihood for less than 6 months.

Education 
The village has a Punjabi medium, co-ed upper primary school established in 1974. The school provide mid-day meal as per Indian Midday Meal Scheme. As per Right of Children to Free and Compulsory Education Act the school provide free education to children between the ages of 6 and 14.

KC Engineering College and Doaba Khalsa Trust Group Of Institutions are the nearest colleges.

List of schools nearby:
Govt Senior Secondary School, Ladhana Jhikka
Dashmesh Model School, Kahma
Govt High School, Jhander Kalan
Govt Gigh School, Khan Khana
Guru Ram Dass Public School, Cheta

Transport 

See also 
List of villages in India

References

External links 
 Tourism of Punjab
 Census of Punjab
 Locality Based PINCode

Villages in Shaheed Bhagat Singh Nagar district